The Land of Smiles is a 1952 West German operetta film directed by Hans Deppe and Erik Ode and starring Mártha Eggerth, Jan Kiepura and Walter Müller. It is an adaptation of the operetta The Land of Smiles composed by Franz Lehár which had previously been made into a 1930 film starring Richard Tauber. It was shot at the Tempelhof Studios in Berlin and on location in Thailand. The film's sets were designed by the art directors Willi Herrmann, Peter Schlewski and Heinrich Weidemann.

Cast
 Mártha Eggerth as Lissy Licht, Sängerin
 Jan Kiepura as Sou Bawana Pantschur, Prinz von Javora
 Walter Müller as Gustl Potter, ein junger Wiener
 Paul Hörbiger as Professor Ferdinand Licht
 Karin Von Dassel as Mi, Schwester von Prinz Sou
 Karl Meixner as Exzellenz Tschang
 Ludwig Schmitz as Kato
 Brigitte Lwowsky as Chrysanthème

References

Bibliography
 Traubner, Richard. Operetta: A Theatrical History. Routledge, 2003.

External links

1952 films
1952 musical films
German musical films
West German films
1950s German-language films
Operetta films
Films based on operettas
Films directed by Hans Deppe
Films directed by Erik Ode
Films set in China
Films set in the 1910s
Remakes of German films
Films scored by Paul Dessau
1950s German films
Films shot in Thailand
Films shot at Tempelhof Studios